Lee Philip Shaffer II (born February 23, 1939) is an American former professional basketball player.

A 6'7" forward born in Chicago, Shaffer starred at the University of North Carolina, where he was the ACC Men's Basketball Player of the Year in 1960.

Shaffer was the #5 selection of the Syracuse Nationals in the 1960 NBA Draft.Naismith Basketball Hall of Fame players Oscar Robertson (#1) and Jerry West (#2). He was selected ahead of future Hall of Famers Lenny Wilkens (#6) and Satch Sanders (#8).

Shaffer and another 1960 First Round Draft choice, Al Bunge (#7), signed with the AAU instead of the NBA, in an era where salaries were small. Shaffer played the 1960-1961 season with the Cleveland Pipers.

He then played three seasons (1961–1964) in the National Basketball Association as a member of the Philadelphia 76ers franchise.  An NBA All-Star in 1963, Shaffer held career averages of 16.8 points per game and 6.3 rebounds per game.

NBA career statistics

Regular season

Playoffs

References

External links
Career statistics

1939 births
Living people
All-American college men's basketball players
American men's basketball players
National Basketball Association All-Stars
North Carolina Tar Heels men's basketball players
Philadelphia 76ers players
Small forwards
Syracuse Nationals draft picks
Syracuse Nationals players
Basketball players from Chicago